Jill Adelaide Neville (29 May 193211 June 1997) was an Australian novelist, playwright and poet.

Biography 
Neville was born in Sydney, Australia, her younger brother was Richard Neville. She grew up in the Blue Mountains area, becoming involved in the Sydney bohemian scene at the age 17. She attended Osborne Ladies' College, and left Australia for London in 1951.

In 1966, Neville published her first novel, Fall-Girl, which was based on her relationships with the poets Peter Porter and Robert Lowell. The novel received acclaim from contemporary critics.

She was married three times: to Peter Duval-Smith in 1960, David Leitch in 1970, and Lewis Wolpert in 1993.

She was elected a Fellow of the Royal Society of Literature in 1995.

Novels 
 
 
 
 
 Fall-Girl (1966)

References

1932 births
1997 deaths
20th-century Australian novelists
20th-century Australian poets
20th-century Australian women writers
20th-century dramatists and playwrights
Australian women novelists
Fellows of the Royal Society of Literature
Writers from Sydney